Locqueltas is a commune in the Morbihan department of Brittany in north-western France.

Toponymy
From the Breton lok which means hermitage (cf.: Locminé), and Gweltaz which is the Breton name for Gildas.

See also
Communes of the Morbihan department

References

External links

 Mayors of Morbihan Association 

Communes of Morbihan